Middle Arm may refer to several places in Canada:

Middle Arm, Avalon Peninsula, Newfoundland and Labrador
Middle Arm, Baie Verte Peninsula, Newfoundland and Labrador
Middle Arm Bridge in Vancouver
Middle Arm, Northern Territory, Australia

See also
 Middle Arm Point Formation, a rock formation in Western Newfoundland, Canada